Hardcore Breakout – Essential Punk is an internationally distributed compilation album mostly of artists from the USA, and the UK.  It was originally released in 2012 as a 77 song CD boxset.  The album was compiled by New Red Archives Records.

Track listing
Disc 1
 "Jolt" - Ultraman 1:58
 "Rich" - Jawbreaker 2:58
 "Indigestion" - Samiam 2:41
 "Stand Up And Fight" - Bedlam Hour 1:50
 "Shave Clean" - Crucial Youth 0:53
 "Full On" - Hogan's Heroes 1:24
 "New Queen" - Samiam 2:23
 "Race Against Time" - The Exploited 4:19
 "Those Who Curse" - Crucial Youth 1:19
 "Zombies" - Kraut 1:55
 "You Popped My Life" - G Whizz 2:37
 "Threat Of Power" - Dirge 2:06
 "Its About Time" - Agitators 1:40
 "Turn To Ice" - Ultraman 2:14
 "Home Sweet Home" - Samiam 1:53
 "Unemployed" - Kraut 2:17
 "Positive Dental Outlook" - Crucial Youth 0:51
 "Megalopolis" - UK Subs 1:55
 "Breaking Your Rules" - Hogan's Heroes 3:59
 "Underground" - Samiam 3:40
 "Sabre Dance" - UK Subs 3:13
 "Reagan Youth" - Reagan Youth 1:19
 "Last Will" - Hogan's Heroes 1:49
 "Juvenile Justice" - Kraut 2:17
 "Frog Song" - P.E.D. 0:49
 "On A String" - Dogs On Ice 2:51
 "People Suck" - No Use For A Name 2:08
 "Hi Jinx" - Fizgig 1:13
 "Backsight" - Caffeine 2:36
 "Im Nobody" - Shleprock 3:42
 "Fill It Up" - Hogan's Heroes 2:14
 "Get Along" - Passed 3:12
 "With A Capitol P" - Rail 2:45
 "Darth Vader" - Fizgig 3:26
 "No Race" - Corrupted Ideals 2:20
 "Flicknife Temper" - Sanity Assassins 3:04
 "Cant Break My Pride" - 2 Line Filler 2:25
 "Cold" - Hogan's Heroes 1:55
 "Messages" - Ultraman 2:34

Disc 2

 "Over The Edge" - Corrupted Ideals 1:54
 "La Mancha Candidate" - Ten Bright Spikes 2:45
 "Sky Flying By" - Samiam 3:54
 "Born Addicted" - No Use For A Name 2:36
 "Mineola" - Ten Bright Spikes 3:22
 "Its Your Right" - The Wretch 2:44
 "Fish People" - Christ on a Crutch 2:06
 "I Dont Care" - Corrupted Ideals 2:17
 "Self Destruct" - UK Subs 2:24
 "Acid Rain" - Reagan Youth 1:54
 "DMV" - No Use For A Name 3:08
 "Slow Stupid & Hungry" - MDC 1:09
 "Go Away" - Samiam 3:47
 "000,000" - Ten Bright Spikes 3:42
 "Fair Warning" - Badtown Boys 1:08
 "Subvert" - Hunchback 2:01
 "Teenage Soap Opera" - Knuckleheads 3:16
 "Superfast Punk" - Accustomed To Nothing 2:37
 "Ghost" - Ultraman 2:33
 "Cobra Crunch" - Loudmouths 1:54
 "I Need A Life" - The Damned 2:23
 "USA PD" - Snap Her 2:59
 "Crucifixion" - Pezz 1:37
 "Rock The Boat" - Anti Flag 2:34
 "Openly" - 2 Line Filler 4:25
 "Left Behind" - The Puritans 2:27
 "Hemorrhage" - Cream Abul Babar 2:37
 "I Should've Known" - Jack Killed Jill 2:34
 "Clown Part" - JFA/Jello Biafra 3:03
 "40 Ounces" - Dead Lazlos Place 3:11
 "F**k You Wheres My Brew" - Dehumanized 2:31
 "Scarred For Life" - Crucial Youth 2:13
 "Sex Change" - Snap Her 1:45
 "War On The Pentagon" - UK Subs 4:06
 "Teenage Genocide" - Swingin Utters 1:39
 "Real Thing" - Squat 2:08
 "I Am The Nation" - Social Unrest 2:33
 "Propaganda" - The Exploited 2:33

References

2012 compilation albums
New Red Archives compilation albums
Hardcore punk compilation albums
New Red Archives albums
Record label compilation albums
Metalcore compilation albums